This is a list of defunct airlines of Tajikistan.

See also
 List of airlines of Tajikistan
 List of airports in Tajikistan

References

Tajikistan
Airlines
Airlines, defunct
Airlines